Prinz Louis Ferdinand is a 1927 German silent historical drama film directed by Hans Behrendt and starring Kurt Junker, Christa Tordy, Hans Stüwe and Jenny Jugo. It was partly shot at the EFA Studios in Berlin. The film's sets were designed by the art director Erich Zander It was based on the life of Prince Louis Ferdinand of Prussia (1772–1806). It was part of the series of Prussian films made during Weimar Germany.

Cast
Kurt Junker as Friedrich Wilhelm III
Christa Tordy as Queen Louise
Hans Stüwe as Louis Ferdinand
Jenny Jugo as Pauline Wiesel
Kenneth Rieve as Prince Wilhelm
Paul Bildt as War Council Wiesel
Arthur Kraußneck as Bißchér
Eduard von Winterstein as Scharnhorst
Heinz Marlow as Ginzelmann
Heinrich Schroth as Yorck
Hermine Sterler as Rahel Lewis
Theodor Loos as Ernst Moritz Arndt
Heinz Hilpert as Johann Gottlieb Fichte
Max Gülstorff as first editor of the Vossische Zeitung
John Gottowt as second editor of the Vossische Zeitung
Ernst Gronau as third editor of the Vossische Zeitung

References

External links

1920s historical films
German historical films
Films of the Weimar Republic
German silent feature films
Films directed by Hans Behrendt
Prussian films
Films set in Berlin
Films set in the 1800s
Napoleonic Wars films
Biographical films about German royalty
Phoebus Film films
German black-and-white films
Films set in the Kingdom of Prussia
1920s German films